Jed Hughes is a former American football coach.  Hughes worked as a graduate assistant for  Stanford University football program from 1972 to 1973.  In 1974, he joined Bo Schembechler's staff at the University of Michigan as a linebacker coach.  He remained at Michigan for two seasons.  In 1977, he joined Terry Donahue's staff at UCLA.  He was UCLA's defensive coordinator from 1977 to 1981.  In 1982, Hughes was hired as the secondary coach for the Minnesota Vikings.  After two seasons with Minnesota, Hughes joined Chuck Noll's staff as the linebackers coach for the Pittsburgh Steelers.  After five years with the Steelers, he finished his football coaching career with the Cleveland Browns in 1989.

References

Cleveland Browns coaches
Minnesota Vikings coaches
Pittsburgh Steelers coaches
Michigan Wolverines football coaches
UCLA Bruins football coaches
Living people
Year of birth missing (living people)